Edwin Lascelles (1799 in Harewood – 25 April 1865 in Wighill Park, near Wetherby) was a British Conservative Party politician.  He was Member of Parliament (MP) for Ripon from 1846 to 1857.

Lascelles was a younger son of Henry Lascelles, 2nd Earl of Harewood. He graduated B.C.L. from All Souls College, Oxford in 1826, and was called to the Bar from the Inner Temple in the same year. Returned MP for Ripon without a contest in January 1846, he was re-elected in 1852 and retired in 1857.

He died suddenly, of apoplexy.

References

External links 
 

1799 births
1865 deaths
Alumni of All Souls College, Oxford
Conservative Party (UK) MPs for English constituencies
Edwin
UK MPs 1841–1847
UK MPs 1847–1852
UK MPs 1852–1857
Younger sons of earls